Ederson Santana de Moraes (born 17 August 1993), known as Ederson, is a Brazilian professional footballer who plays as a goalkeeper for  club Manchester City and the Brazil national team.

Ederson started his career at São Paulo in 2008 before joining Portuguese side Benfica one year later, where he would spend two seasons. In 2012, he transferred from Ribeirão to Primeira Liga side Rio Ave and became a regular starter there. He rejoined Benfica in 2015 and was assigned to the reserves before debuting for the first team, with whom he would win four major titles in two seasons. For the 2017–18 season, Ederson joined English club Manchester City for £35 million and became the most expensive goalkeeper of all-time in terms of the nominal value of pound sterling at the time of his transfer. He went on to win the Premier League and EFL Cup in his first season in England, and won a domestic treble the following season.

Ederson made his senior debut for Brazil in 2017. He was chosen in Brazil's squad for the FIFA World Cup in 2018 and 2022 and the Copa América in 2019 and 2021, winning the 2019 tournament.

Club career

Early career 
Born in Osasco, São Paulo, Ederson started his football career in 2008 at local club São Paulo FC with whom he played one season, before joining Benfica in Portugal. Here, at the age of 16, he spent two years as a junior, being released in 2011 and eventually signing for Second Division side Ribeirão.

A year later, Ederson joined Primeira Liga side Rio Ave, signing a contract until 2014 in summer 2012. In April 2015, following a string of good performances and a call up to the Brazil under-23 squad, he signed a new contract with the club that would last until 2019.

Benfica

On 27 June 2015, Ederson rejoined Portuguese champions Benfica. Then, in July, he officially signed a five-year contract with the club, in a deal worth €500,000, and set a €45 million release clause. Rio Ave would keep 50% of the upcoming keeper's economic rights. In the 2015–16 season, Ederson started as a second choice in line for the first team, defended by compatriot and international Júlio César. Ederson first played some matches in the Segunda Liga with the reserve team and in the Taça da Liga with the main squad, before playing in the Primeira Liga on 5 March 2016 against local rivals Sporting CP, replacing injured Júlio César. Benfica won the Lisbon derby 0–1 and took the first place of Primeira Liga. He would then be part of eleven more victories that would seal Benfica's 35th league title, their third in a row. Five days later, he played the Taça da Liga final against Marítimo, which Benfica won 6–2. In addition, he played three matches in the Champions League campaign, where Benfica reached the quarter-finals. In his next season, he and Benfica won the treble of Primeira Liga, Taça de Portugal and Supertaça Cândido de Oliveira.

Manchester City

On 1 June 2017, Benfica announced that Ederson had joined Premier League club Manchester City for £35 million (€40 million). At the time, the transfer made him the second most expensive goalkeeper of all-time – currently fourth highest – after Gianluigi Buffon (£33 million), whose transfer fee, although the second highest ever in pounds sterling, still remained the highest of all time in euros (€52 million in 2001) until Alisson Becker's (€75 million in 2018) and now Kepa Arrizabalaga's (€80 million in 2018). Ederson's transfer equalled Axel Witsel's as the largest fee a club has ever paid for a Benfica player.

Ederson was immediately inserted as Pep Guardiola's first choice goalkeeper, supplanting Claudio Bravo. He made his competitive debut for the club on 12 August 2017 in a 0–2 away win at Brighton & Hove Albion, where he kept a clean sheet. On 9 September against Liverpool, Ederson suffered a kick to the face by Sadio Mané, and was forced to leave the game after eight minutes of treatment. Ederson received eight stitches, and Mané was sent off by referee Jon Moss and banned for the subsequent three matches. Ederson made his next start the following week in the Champions League against Feyenoord, sporting a piece of protective headgear. Ederson believed that Mané's collision was accidental, and accepted an apology from the Liverpool player.

On 19 August 2018, Ederson became the first Manchester City goalkeeper to provide a Premier League assist, as his goal-kick was converted by Sergio Agüero for the opening goal in a 6–1 win over Huddersfield Town.

On 26 July 2020, Ederson was awarded the Golden Glove for keeping the most clean sheets (16) in the 2019–20 Premier League season after a 5–0 home win against Norwich City.

International career
Ederson was named in Brazil's provisional squad for Copa América Centenario but was cut from the final squad due to injury. His debut for the national team came in a 3–0 win over Chile in a 2018 World Cup qualifier in October 2017. In May 2018, he was named in Tite's final 23-man squad for the World Cup in Russia.

In May 2019, Ederson was included in Brazil's 23-man squad for the 2019 Copa América.

In June 2021, he made his major tournament debut for Brazil, starting and keeping a clean sheet in a 4–0 victory over Peru at the 2021 Copa América. On 10 July, he started in his nation's 1–0 defeat to rivals Argentina in the final.

On 7 November 2022, Ederson was named in the squad for the 2022 FIFA World Cup.

Style of play
Ederson has been described as an agile, commanding, and physically imposing keeper, who possesses both physical strength and good reflexes and shot-stopping abilities between the posts. However, he is mostly highly regarded for his distribution and skill with the ball at his feet than for his abilities as shot-stopper: his control and confidence on the ball enables him to retain possession and quickly play the ball out from the back on the ground with his hands or either foot – even when put under pressure – or launch an attack with long kicks. Although naturally left-footed, he is capable of using either foot. Regarding his distribution, former Manchester City goalkeeper Shay Given described Ederson as "the best goalkeeper in the world with his feet" in 2018; his range of passing has also led to him be described as a playmaker in the media.

He is also very quick when rushing off his line, and often functions as a sweeper-keeper. Regarded as a highly promising prospect in his formative years, he stood out for his decision making, consistency, and composure in goal, as well as his ability to organise his defence, and has also become an intelligent reader of the game; as such, some in the sport consider him to be one of the best goalkeepers in the Premier League and in world football.

Personal life
Ederson acquired Portuguese citizenship in 2016. His body is heavily covered in tattoos, including a rose and a skull on his neck, angel wings on his back and a Portuguese League trophy on his leg, which he won for Benfica in 2016 and in 2017. Ederson also holds the Guinness World Record for Longest Football Drop Kick, which he achieved after kicking the ball 75.35 m (247 ft 2 in) across the ground at the Etihad Campus on 10 May 2018.

Career statistics

Club

International

Honours
Rio Ave
Taça de Portugal runner-up: 2013–14
Taça da Liga runner-up: 2013–14

Benfica
Primeira Liga: 2015–16, 2016–17
Taça de Portugal: 2016–17
Taça da Liga: 2015–16

Manchester City
Premier League: 2017–18, 2018–19, 2020–21, 2021–22
FA Cup: 2018–19
EFL Cup: 2017–18, 2018–19, 2019–20, 2020–21
FA Community Shield: 2018, 2019
UEFA Champions League runner-up: 2020–21

Brazil
Copa América: 2019

Individual
O Jogo Team of the Year: 2016
SJPF Primeira Liga Team of the Year: 2016
LPFP Primeira Liga Goalkeeper of the Year: 2016–17
UEFA Champions League Breakthrough XI: 2017
PFA Premier League Team of the Year: 2018–19, 2020–21
Premier League Golden Glove: 2019–20, 2020–21, 2021–22
UEFA Champions League Squad of the Season: 2020–21

References

External links

1993 births
Living people
People from Osasco
Footballers from São Paulo (state)
Brazilian footballers
Association football goalkeepers
G.D. Ribeirão players
Rio Ave F.C. players
S.L. Benfica B players
S.L. Benfica footballers
Manchester City F.C. players
Primeira Liga players
Liga Portugal 2 players
Premier League players
FA Cup Final players
Brazil international footballers
2018 FIFA World Cup players
2019 Copa América players
2021 Copa América players
2022 FIFA World Cup players
Copa América-winning players
Brazilian expatriate footballers
Expatriate footballers in England
Expatriate footballers in Portugal
Brazilian expatriate sportspeople in England
Brazilian expatriate sportspeople in Portugal
Naturalised citizens of Portugal